The Yelagiri Express is a daily train which runs between Jolarpettai and Chennai.  The train stops at Vaniyambadi, Ambur, Melpadi, Valathoor, Gudiyattam, Katpadi Junction,Mukundarayapuram, Walajah Road, Sholingur, Anavardikanpettai, Chitteri, Arakkonam Junction, Thiruvallur, Perambur and MGR Chennai Central.

Relevance
This train traces its name to the Yelagiri hills near Jolarpettai. Jolarpettai is at the foothills of Yelagiri.

[Once before 2013 it runs from Tiruppathur to mgr chennai central.

After 2013 it announced to run from Jolarpettai(JTJ) to Mgr chennai central (MAS)].

The regional people and regular passengers call it as JP (JP-Jolarpet)

This train carries average of 3k to 5k peoples daily express , There was a Huge attachment between passengers and train.

Composition
The train is usually hauled by a powerful Arakkonam WAP4 locomotive or Royapuram WAP 7 . As the train completes its to-fro journey in a single day,  The train has 24 coaches. The coaches include 20 General second class, 2 First class, 2 luggage cum-brake van coaches. First 3 and Last 3 compartments are dedicated ladies coaches.

Service
Even though it is classified as Express, this train stops in many stations but not all. , which can accelerate and decelerate the 24 carriage train between frequent stoppages. The train arrives Chennai Central by 9:10 and departs by 17:55 which  helps the passengers to attend their work everyday even from a distant home.

References 

Transport in Chennai
Named passenger trains of India
Rail transport in Tamil Nadu
Express trains in India